The 2018–19 season was Guadalajara's second competitive season and second season in the Liga MX Femenil, the top flight of Mexican women's football.

Guadalajara finished fourth in the Apertura tournament, qualifying for the playoffs, but were eliminated in semifinals by UANL.

The next tournament, the Clausura 2019, the team finished eight overall, failing to qualify for the playoffs.

For the Clausura tournament, manager Luis Camacho was replaced by Luis Manuel Díaz, who led the team for the rest of the season.

Squad

Apertura

Clausura

Transfers

In

Out

Coaching staff

Apertura

Clausura

Competitions

Overview

Torneo Apertura

League table

Matches

Playoffs

Quarterfinals

Semifinals

Torneo Clausura

League table

Matches

Statistics

Appearances and goals

|-

|-
! colspan=10 style=background:#dcdcdc | Players that left the club during the season

|-
|}

Goalscorers

Own goals

References

C.D. Guadalajara (women) seasons
Mexican football clubs 2018–19 season